Zoe Celia Ducós Gallegos (March 6, 1928 - November 11, 2002) was an Argentine film, stage, and television actress.

Biography
She studied at the National Conservatory of Music and Performing Arts and upon graduation, earned the Grand Prize of Honor bestowed by the National Commission of Culture for best actress in the National Competition of Vocational Theatres. The prize included a contract to join the cast of Teatro Nacional Cervantes, in which she performed between 1948 and 1951.

Personal life
She had a relationship with Mexican singer Genaro Salinas, that was married and he was acting in Buenos Aires, then she married writer and film director José María Fernández Unsáin, but they divorced. She married Miguel Silvio Sanz, head of the dreaded police of the dictator Marcos Pérez Jiménez. After her husband died she returned to Venezuela at the beginning of the 1970s. She married film director Carlos Stevani. At the end of the 1990s she got Alzheimer's disease and she was admitted to the Instituto geriátrico en Colinas de Bello Monte, were she died of a stroke on November 11, 2002 in Caracas, Venezuela.

Career
In 1948, she debuted in a film directed by Luis César Amadori. Without abandoning her stage work, she continued filming in later years. For her rule in Suburban directed by León Klimovsky, she was awarded Best Actress by the Association of Cinema Writers of Argentina. In 1952, Ducós settled in Venezuela after a visit through Spain, and debuted at the Teatro Municipal. She appeared on Radio Caracas Televisión. She continued her theater work and also participated in many telenovelas.

Filmography 
Actress

Television

References

External links

1928 births
2002 deaths
People from Buenos Aires
Argentine film actresses
Argentine stage actresses
Argentine television actresses
Argentine expatriates in Venezuela